Henry James Reynolds (August 25, 1892 – February 18, 1977) was a Canadian professional ice hockey player. He played with the Toronto 228th Battalion of the National Hockey Association.

References

1892 births
1977 deaths
Canadian ice hockey left wingers
Ice hockey people from Ontario
Sportspeople from North Bay, Ontario
Toronto 228th Battalion players